Abdoltajj od Din (also Romanized as ‘Abdoltājj od Dīn; also known as ‘Abd ot Tāj ad Dīn, ‘Abd ot Tāj od Dīn, Abdul Tāj Dīn, and ‘Abowl Tājed Dīn) is a village in Fash Rural District, in the Central District of Kangavar County, Kermanshah Province, Iran. At the 2006 census, its population was 704, in 147 families.

References 

Populated places in Kangavar County